Moritz Hermann Eduard Meier (1 January 1796 – 5 December 1855) was a German classical philologist, born at Glogau.

At the age of 24, he became an associate professor at the University of Greifswald. In 1825, he was named professor of classical philology at the University of Halle, where he remained until his death.

Friedrich August Wolf, and especially Wolf's famous pupil, August Boeckh, whose classic work on the public economy of Athens appeared in 1817, had a great influence on Meier. His own first important publication dealt with a question in the legal antiquities of Athens, "Historia Juris Attici de Bonis Damnatorum", etc. (Berlin, 1819);  but his greatest work was written in collaboration with G. F. Schömann, "Der Attische Process" (Berlin, 1824);  and was crowned by the Berlin Royal Academy. This treatise, now revised by J. H. Lipsius (Berlin 1883–87), remains the standard work on Athenian legal procedure.

Meier also prepared an edition of Demosthenes "Against Meidias" and published many papers on subjects relating to classical antiquity, especially Andocides and Theophrastus —  these were collected after his death in "Opuscula" (1861–63). Much of his energy, however, while resident at Halle, was spent on editorial duties, as he was an editor of the Halle "Allgemeine Zeitung" for many years, and also co-editor of the "Allgemeine Encyclopädie der Wissenschaften und Künste" from 1830 to 1855.

External links and references 
 Moritz Hermann Eduard Meier @ Jewish Encyclopedia  
 

1796 births
1855 deaths
19th-century German people
German classical scholars
German classical philologists
Academic staff of the University of Greifswald
German people of Jewish descent
Silesian Jews
People from the Province of Silesia
People from Głogów